Cercospora solani is a fungal plant pathogen.

References

External links

solani
Fungal plant pathogens and diseases